Damian Kugiel (born 30 May 1995) is a Polish footballer who plays as a forward for GKS Kowale.

References

External links
 

1995 births
Living people
Polish footballers
Poland youth international footballers
Association football forwards
Lechia Gdańsk players
Lechia Gdańsk II players
Bałtyk Gdynia players
Sportspeople from Gdańsk
Ekstraklasa players
II liga players
III liga players
IV liga players